Ada Jemima Crossley (3 March 1871 – 17 October 1929) was an Australian contralto notable as the first Red Seal recording artist engaged in the US by the Victor Talking Machine Company in 1903.

Born at Tarraville, Gippsland, Victoria, she was the daughter of Edwards Wallis Crossley (died 11 April 1902), an ironmonger, and Harriette, née Morris, both from Northamptonshire, England. Ada was the sixth surviving child in a family of twelve children.

Crossley's singing in the country met with so much appreciation that she was sent to Melbourne to be trained, where Sir Frederic Cowen, (who had come from London to conduct the orchestra at the Melbourne International Exhibition of 1888–9), heard her sing and gave her advice. She studied under Madame Fanny Simonsen for singing, and under Alberto Zelman the elder for piano and harmony.

Her first appearance was with the Philharmonic Society at Melbourne in 1889. She sang frequently in Melbourne at concerts and in oratorio, and was the principal contralto in the choir of Charles Strong's Australian Church. She made her début performance in Sydney in January 1892, and also became well known there.

In 1894, she went to Europe and studied under Mathilde Marchesi for voice production, and under (Sir) Charles Santley for oratorio work. Her first appearance in London was at the Queen's Hall on 18 May 1895, when she had an immediate success. For many years she held a leading place at music festivals and on the concert platform, and she gave five command performances before Queen Victoria in two years. She was also successful in America, and on returning to Australia in 1904 her tour was a series of triumphs.

She also visited South Africa, and her second tour in Australia in 1908 was again very successful. She sang regularly at English festivals until 1913 but retired a few years later, though she made occasional appearances for charity. On 27 February 1923 she appeared in concert at Wigmore Hall in support of her friend and protégée, the South Australian contralto Clara Serena. The London newspapers gave positive reviews, also praising Serena's accompanist (and husband) Roy Mellish. 
She never lost her love for her native country and her Cavendish Square, London, house was always open to young singers and artists from Australia. There they received advice, hospitality, and sometimes assistance, without any suggestion of patronage.

Personal
On 16 May 1905 Crossley married Francis Muecke CBE FRCS, son of H. C. E. Muecke. The wedding, which took place at St Marylebone Parish Church, was a grand social occasion. A choir comprising Evangeline Florence, Mary Conly, Nora Long, Elsie Jones, Eva Mylott, Meta Buring, May Otto, Ivy Ansley and May Putney sang the hymn "O Perfect Love", specially arranged by George H. Clutsam and directed by Minna Fischer.

For a time they had a cottage home at St John's Wood, but as Muecke's London practice grew, a city address became necessary.

There were no children. Crossley died at London after a short illness on 17 October 1929.

References

1871 births
1929 deaths
Operatic contraltos
Australian contraltos
19th-century Australian women singers
Musicians from Victoria (Australia)
20th-century Australian women singers
Australian people of English descent
Australian emigrants to England